TN5 or TN-5 may refer to:
 Tennessee's 5th congressional district
 Tennessee State Route 5
 Transposase Tn5, an enzyme
 Honda TN-V, a pickup truck
 TN5, a postcode district in Wadhurst, England; see TN postcode area